José Bademian Orchanian (27 April 1927 – 25 August 2013) was a Uruguayan chess FIDE Master (FM) of Armenian origin and a winner of the Uruguayan Chess Championship (1976).

Biography
In the 1970s and 1980s José Bademian Orchanian was one of leading Uruguayan chess players. He won three medals in Uruguayan Chess Championships: gold (1976), silver (1974) and bronze (1987). José Bademian Orchanian twice participated in Pan American Chess Championships. He was a multiple participant in the traditional Mar del Plata chess tournament.

José Bademian Orchanian played for Uruguay in the Chess Olympiads:
 in 1974, at the second board in the 21st Chess Olympiad in Nice (+7, =3, −7),
 in 1976, at the second board in the 22nd Chess Olympiad in Haifa (+5, =2, −3),
 in 1978, at the fourth board in the 23rd Chess Olympiad in Buenos Aires (+4, =4, −3),
 in 1986, at the fourth board in the 27th Chess Olympiad in Dubai (+3, =0, −4).

José Bademian Orchanian played for Uruguay in the Pan American Team Chess Championship:
 in 1987, at the second board in the 3rd Panamerican Team Chess Championship in Junín (+0, =0, −8).

References

External links

José Bademian Orchanian chess games at 365chess.com

1927 births
2013 deaths
Uruguayan people of Armenian descent
Uruguayan chess players
Chess FIDE Masters
Chess Olympiad competitors
20th-century chess players